"I Could Break Your Heart Any Day of the Week" is a song by American recording artist Mandy Moore from her fifth studio album, Amanda Leigh. It was released on June 15, 2009 by Storefront Records as the lead single of the album. The song was written by Moore and Mike Viola.

Release and promotion
Moore has promoted the song in many places, such as:
The Ellen DeGeneres Show on May 26, 2009
The Tonight Show with Jay Leno
Amoeba Music Hollywood
Late Night with Jimmy Fallon

Music video
The music video premiered on Monday, April 20, 2009, on Yahoo! Music.

Charts

References

2009 singles
2009 songs
Mandy Moore songs
Songs written by Mike Viola
Songs written by Mandy Moore